Hochtor, at , is the highest mountain in the Ennstaler Alps, part of the Northern Limestone Alps, in Styria, Austria.

The mountain is protected as part of Gesäuse National Park, the third largest in Austria.

Gallery

See also
List of Alpine peaks by prominence

References

External links
 
 "Hochtor, Austria" on Peakbagger

Mountains of the Alps
Ennstal Alps
Mountains of Styria